Hirtomegatoma is a genus of beetles in the family Dermestidae, containing the following species:

 Hirtomegatoma infasciata Pic, 1931
 Hirtomegatoma nigra Háva, 2003

References

Dermestidae